The Teshi Military College is a military college in the Ghanaian city of Teshie. Johnny Paul Koroma trained recruits of the Sierra Leone Armed Forces there in 1994.

Military of Sierra Leone